Proxima may refer to one of the following:

 ITV Proxima, a French paraglider design 
 Próxima or PROXIMA, a 2007 Spanish science fiction film
 Proxima Midnight, a Marvel Comics character
 Proxima (2013 novel), a science fiction novel by Stephen Baxter
Proxima Starfall, a supporting character in the Nick Show Mysticons.
 Lady Proxima, a crime boss in the 2018 film Solo: A Star Wars Story
 Proxima (film), a 2019 science fiction film directed by Alice Winocour and starring Eva Green
 "Proxima", a song by the English heavy metal band Demon from their 1985 album British Standard Approved

See also
 Proxima Centauri, a red dwarf, the nearest star to Earth other than the Sun
 Proxima Ophiuchi, a red dwarf
 
 
 Proximus (disambiguation)